The mid back rounded vowel is a type of vowel sound, used in some spoken languages. While there is no dedicated symbol in the International Phonetic Alphabet that represents the exact mid back rounded vowel between close-mid  and open-mid , it is normally written . There was an alternative IPA symbol for this sound, ⟨ꭥ⟩. A non-IPA letter  is also found.

Just because a language has only one non-close non-open back vowel, it still may not be a true-mid vowel. Tukang Besi is a language in Sulawesi, Indonesia, with a close-mid . Taba, another language in Indonesia, in the Maluku Islands, has an open-mid . In both languages, there is no contrast with another mid (true-mid or close-mid) vowel.

Kensiu, in Malaysia and Thailand, is highly unusual in that it contrasts true-mid vowels with close-mid and open-mid vowels without any difference in other parameters, such as backness or roundedness.

Features

Occurrence

Notes

References

External links
 
 

Mid vowels
Back vowels
Rounded vowels

pl:Samogłoska półprzymknięta tylna zaokrąglona